Thomas Hale Boggs Jr. (September 18, 1940 – September 15, 2014) was an American lawyer and lobbyist based in Washington, D.C.

Biography 

Boggs was the son of Thomas Hale Boggs (1914–1972), a United States Representative from Louisiana's 2nd congressional district, and Lindy Boggs (1916–2013), her husband's successor in the 2nd congressional district and thereafter U.S. Ambassador to the Vatican under U.S. President Bill Clinton. His siblings included journalist and news commentator Cokie Roberts (1943–2019) and Barbara Boggs Sigmund (1939–1990), who served as the mayor of Princeton, New Jersey.

Lobbying career 
Boggs, a Democrat, began his legal practice in New Orleans and later moved to Washington, D.C., to become a lawyer and lobbyist. He joined the law/lobbyist firm of James R. Patton Jr., which today is known as Squire Patton Boggs. Boggs was the firm's senior partner. With Patton Boggs, he was known for lobbying on major issues, including:
 Repealing the Glass-Steagall Act on behalf of the American Bankers Association
 Litigation against Chevron for environmental issues in Ecuador
 The $1.5 billion federal bailout of Chrysler in 1979

Political campaign 
In 1970, Boggs unsuccessfully ran for the United States House of Representatives from Maryland's 8th congressional district against incumbent Republican Gilbert Gude.

Death and legacy
Boggs died of an apparent heart attack September 15, 2014, three days before his 74th birthday. He is interred at the historic Congressional Cemetery in Washington, D.C.

References

External links

CNN Saturday Morning News, "Novak Zone: Interview with Tommy Boggs", November 29, 2003

1940 births
2014 deaths
American lobbyists
Georgetown University Law Center alumni
Lawyers from New Orleans
Maryland Democrats
People from Bethesda, Maryland
People from Chevy Chase, Maryland
Lawyers from Washington, D.C.
Georgetown Preparatory School alumni
Boggs family
Claiborne family
20th-century American lawyers
People associated with Squire Patton Boggs